The Uzbekistan State Museum of Nature is the oldest museum operating in Uzbekistan. The museum's main purpose is to show the natural beauty of Uzbekistan and to help protect its environment. The museum features chronologically-ordered exhibits and seeks to educate visitors about Uzbekistan's geography through time.

Contents 
The Museum consists of about four hundred thousand specimens and artefacts that are on display. Three hundred thousand items are insects. Eleven thousand are herbarium leaves and other zoological and geological materials. The museum is visited mainly by Uzbeks and visitors from formerly-Soviet Union countries. 

The four areas in the museum are geological-geographic department, flora and fauna department, scientific department and funds department.

The museum organizes many social events in Tashkent, including assemblies in many of the Republic's schools, academic lyceums, colleges and higher education facilities.

History 

The Museum is the oldest in Uzbekistan. It was established in Tashkent by Russian scientists on July 12, 1876, as the Tashkent Museum. The museum closed and re-opened several times. In 1919, it opened as Turkestan National Museum. Two years later, in 1921, it became The State Museum of Nature of Uzbekistan. In 1930, the museum joined with the agricultural museum and became the "Central Asian Museum of Nature and Building Power". Five years later the museum took its current name. In 1937, the museum opened a classroom for students to receive lectures on Uzbekistan nature.

The museum has received many government awards for its contribution to the development of the academic sphere in Uzbekistan. In 1967, the museum was awarded "Uzbekistan's Best Museum". In 2006, the museum celebrated its 130-year anniversary.

See also 
State Museum of History of Uzbekistan
The Museum of Health Care of Uzbekistan
The Museum of Communication History in Uzbekistan
Museum of Arts of Uzbekistan
Tashkent Museum of Railway Techniques
Museum of Geology, Tashkent
Tashkent Poly-technical Museum
The Alisher Navoi State Museum of Literature
Museum of Victims of Political Repression in Tashkent
Art Gallery of Uzbekistan
Tashkent Planetarium

References

External links 
News about the museum in Uzbek
Article about the museum in English
Article about the Institute in English
Article about the museum in English
Brochure about the museum in Uzbek

Museums in Tashkent
Natural history museums